Bobby Lawns Williams (September 30, 1895 to December 30, 1978) was an American baseball shortstop in the Negro leagues. He attended New Orleans University, and played the first seven or eight years for the Chicago American Giants.

At age 57, Williams received votes listing him on the 1952 Pittsburgh Courier player-voted poll of the Negro leagues' best players ever.

References

External links
 and Baseball-Reference Black Baseball stats and Seamheads
  and Seamheads

Negro league baseball managers
Bacharach Giants players
Chicago American Giants players
Cleveland Giants players
Cleveland Red Sox players
Cleveland Tigers (baseball) players
Columbus Blue Birds players
Homestead Grays players
Indianapolis ABCs players
Indianapolis Clowns players
Lincoln Giants players
Pittsburgh Crawfords players
1895 births
1978 deaths
20th-century African-American sportspeople
Baseball infielders